Ana Ivanovic was the defending champion, but she decided not to compete this year.

Yanina Wickmayer won the title, defeating Petra Kvitová in the final 6–3, 6–4.

Seeds

Draw

Finals

Top half

Bottom half

External links
 Main Draw
 Qualifying Draw

Generali Ladies Linz